José María Lorant (21 August 1955 – 12 December 2014) was an Argentine football player and coach.

Career
Lorant played for Argentino de Rosario, Sarmiento, Emelec, Temperley, Newell's Old Boys, Tigre and Argentino de Merlo. He also managed a number of Argentine club sides.

References

1955 births
2014 deaths
Argentine footballers
Argentine football managers
Argentino de Rosario footballers
Club Atlético Sarmiento footballers
C.S. Emelec footballers
Club Atlético Temperley footballers
Newell's Old Boys footballers
Club Atlético Tigre footballers
Argentino de Merlo footballers
Association football midfielders
Argentine expatriate footballers
Argentine expatriate sportspeople in Ecuador
Expatriate footballers in Ecuador